Zanthoxylum caribaeum is a species of plant in the family Rutaceae. It is found in Belize, Guatemala, and Honduras.

References

caribaeum
Taxonomy articles created by Polbot